Amara bokori is a species of beetle of the genus Amara in the family Carabidae.

References 

bokori
Beetles described in 1929
Taxa named by Ernő Csíki